Albo(no) (year of birth unknown - after 1177 in Freising) was from 1165 to 1169 the 28th Bishop of Passau.

Biography
Until his appointment to the bishop, Albo was a canon in Passau and Provost in Moosburg.
With regard to the former Papacy, he sought a middle position, and therefore received neither the archbishop of Salzburg, nor the archbishop of Mainz. In 1169 he had to abdicate after a profound disagreement with the cathedral chapter and the citizens of Passau. He became a canonist in Freising, where he died after 1177.

References

Year of birth unknown
Date of death missing
Roman Catholic bishops of Passau
12th-century Roman Catholic bishops in Bavaria